Evolution Records was a record label operated by the Stereo Dimension Records subsidiary of the Longines Symphonette Society, a unit of the Longines watch company. It was founded in 1969 as the retail arm of the mail-order Longines Symphonette Society which usually issued box sets of old radio shows, including a two-record set of Orson Welles's 1938 Mercury Theatre on the Air production of "The War of the Worlds", or traditional pop songs.  Loren Becker was the president of the label.  In 1973 the label made a concerted effort to break into the soul music genre.

The Canadian rock group Lighthouse earned Evolution its first gold record.  Evolution sold Lighthouse's contract to Polydor Records, but retained rights to material originally issued on Evolution.

Longines exited the record business in 1975.

Artists
 Bloontz
 Dorothea Joyce
 Lighthouse
 Richard Sarstedt
 Steel River

References

External links 
Evolution Album Discography — Both Sides Now Publications

Defunct record labels of the United States
Record labels established in 1969
Record labels disestablished in 1975